Viveca Hollmerus, Lady Cable (1920–2004) was a Finnish-Swedish author. In 1951 she was awarded the Svenska Dagbladet Literature Prize, shared with Willy Kyrklund, Staffan Larsson and Per Anders Fogelstrom.

In 1954 she married the British diplomat Sir James Cable; they had one son.

She died in 2004 and is buried in the Ascension Parish Burial Ground, Cambridge, England with her husband who died in 2001.

Bibliography 

Nervlänges 1950
Glasflötet 1951
Dagblind 1952
Ingenmanstid 1954
Då skrek Katharine 1969

References

External links 
 

1920 births
2004 deaths
Finnish writers
Finnish emigrants to the United Kingdom